The 2020 Bingöl earthquake occurred at 17:24 local time (14:24 UTC) on 14 June in Bingöl, Turkey. The magnitude of the earthquake was determined to be 5.8 . The earthquake's epicentre was close to the Kaynarpınar village in Karlıova, Bingöl and felt in the neighbouring provinces of Erzurum, Diyarbakır, Elazığ and Muş. 392 aftershocks were detected following the earthquake, with the largest being a 5.5  event.

Damage 
The earthquake caused damage in Kaynarpınar village of Karlıova and Elmalı and Dinarbey villages of Yedisu. 10 houses in Elmalı and Dinarbey collapsed and injured 21 people while a police station in Kaynarpınar collapsed killing 1 village guard.

See also 

 2020 Elazığ earthquake
 2020 Iran-Turkey earthquakes
 List of Earthquakes in Turkey
 List of earthquakes in 2020

References 

2020 disasters in Turkey
2020 earthquakes
Earthquakes in Turkey
History of Bingöl Province
June 2020 events in Turkey